The 20 August 1955 Stadium is a multi-purpose stadium located in Bordj Bou Arréridj, Algeria. It is currently used mostly for football matches and is the home ground of Bordj Bou Arréridj.  The stadium holds 15,000 people.

References

20 Aout
Buildings and structures in Bordj Bou Arréridj Province
Multi-purpose stadiums in Algeria